is a railway station on the Iida Line in Tenryū-ku, Hamamatsu, Shizuoka Prefecture, Japan, operated by Central Japan Railway Company (JR Central).

Lines
Hayase Station is served by the Iida Line and is 58.5 kilometers from the starting point of the line at Toyohashi Station.

Station layout
The station has one ground-level side platform serving a single bi-directional track. There is no station building. The station is not attended.

Adjacent stations

Station history
Hayase Station was established on May 10, 1935 as the Hayase Signal Depot on the now defunct Sanshin Railway. On August 1, 1943, the Sanshin Railway was nationalized along with several other local lines to form the Iida line. Hayase was elevated to a full station on December 1, 1946. Along with the division and privatization of JNR on April 1, 1987, the station came under the control and operation of the Central Japan Railway Company.

Passenger statistics
In fiscal 2016, the station was used by an average of 9 passengers daily (boarding passengers only).

Surrounding area

See also
 List of railway stations in Japan

References

External links

  Iida Line station information

Stations of Central Japan Railway Company
Iida Line
Railway stations in Japan opened in 1946
Railway stations in Shizuoka Prefecture
Railway stations in Hamamatsu